Karl-Heinz 'Kalli' Kamp (born 26 September 1946) is a German retired football player and coach. He spent 13 seasons in the Bundesliga with SV Werder Bremen. As of July 2012, he works as a scout for SV Werder Bremen.

References

External links
 

1946 births
Living people
People from Bingen am Rhein
German footballers
Footballers from Rhineland-Palatinate
Association football defenders
Association football midfielders
BFV Hassia Bingen players
Bundesliga players
2. Bundesliga players
SpVgg Greuther Fürth players
SV Werder Bremen players
German football managers
SV Werder Bremen II managers